Kunsan National University is a national university located in Miryong-dong, Gunsan, Jeollabuk-do, in western South Korea.  The university first opened its doors in 1947 as Kunsan Teachers' College.  It gained university status in 1991.

Notable people
Jin Hee-kyung, actress
Song Sae-byeok, actor

See also
List of national universities in South Korea
List of universities and colleges in South Korea
Education in Korea

External links
Official website 
Official website (in English)

Universities and colleges in North Jeolla Province
National universities and colleges in South Korea
Gunsan
1947 establishments in Korea
Educational institutions established in 1947